Simon Loshi (16 February 2000) is a footballer who plays as a right-back for the Belgian club Hoogstraten VV. Born in Netherlands, he has chosen to represent Kosovo at the international level.

Club career

Youth and Jong ADO 
Loshi played in his youth at Willem II and, for ten years, at Feyenoord. 

On 3 July 2019, Loshi joined Derde Divisie side Jong ADO. His debut with Jong ADO came on 1 September in a 5–0 away defeat against OSS '20, substituting Nadir Achahbar in the 81st minute.

Feronikeli and Resovia 
On 3 December 2019, Loshi joined Feronikeli in the Football Superleague of Kosovo. On 12 February 2020, he made his professional cup debut with Feronikeli in the 2019–20 Kosovar Cup quarter-finals against Liria Prizren starting line-up. Ten days later, he made his professional league debut in a 2–1 away defeat against Llapi, again in the starting line-up.

On 5 September 2020, Loshi joined Polish I liga side Resovia after agreeing to a one-year contract with an option to extend it for two years. He did not play a single game for the club. In the winter break of the 2020–21 season, his contract was terminated.

On 1 February 2021, Loshi returned to Feronikeli. Fourteen days later he was fielded, playing in the 1–1 home draw against Gjilani, after replacing Adem Maliqi in the 89th minute.

ASWH and Hoogstraten
On 7 February 2022, Loshi and his brother Skender joined the Dutch Tweede Divisie side ASWH. Before the season ended, the Loshis and ASWH separated.

In the new season starting in 2022, Simon Loshi plays at Hoogstraten VV in Belgium.

International career
On 15 March 2021, Loshi received a call-up from the Kosovo under-21 side for friendly matches against Qatar under-23. He was an unused substitute in these matches.

References

External links

2000 births
Living people
Footballers from Tilburg
Kosovan footballers
Kosovan expatriate footballers
Kosovan expatriate sportspeople in Poland
Kosovan expatriate sportspeople in Belgium
Dutch footballers
Dutch expatriate footballers
Dutch expatriate sportspeople in Poland
Dutch expatriate sportspeople in Belgium
Derde Divisie players
ADO Den Haag players
Football Superleague of Kosovo players
KF Feronikeli players
Resovia (football) players
ASWH players